The Messerschmitt Me 265 was a design project for a Zerstörer (“Destroyer;” heavy fighter), produced by leading German aircraft manufacturer Messerschmitt in World War II.

Design
The Me 265 was designed in 1942, intended to replace the failing Me 210. It was also known as the Lippisch Li P 10.

The Me 265 was an aerodynamically advanced design, using a tailless delta-shaped flying wing and two pusher propellers built into the wing. The two-man crew sat back-to-back in the cockpit. It was powered by two Daimler-Benz DB 603 liquid-cooled, 12-cylinder piston engines, each engine producing 1,750 hp. These engines were mounted in a pusher configuration.

Ultimately, the design of the Me 265/Li P 10 was rejected in favour of the more conventional Me 410, which re-used a greater proportion of Me 210 components and could be brought into production more quickly.

Specifications

See also

Notes

References
Luftwaffe Secret Projects - Ground Attack & Special Purpose Aircraft, D. Herwig & H. Rode, 

Me 265
1940s German fighter aircraft
Twin-engined pusher aircraft
Abandoned military aircraft projects of Germany